Theodore Too is a large-scale imitation tugboat built in Dayspring, Nova Scotia in 2000 based on the fictional television tugboat character Theodore Tugboat. Theodore Too was located in Bedford, Nova Scotia but arrived in Hamilton, Ontario, his new home, on July 18, 2021.

History
Theodore Too was commissioned by Cochran Entertainment, Inc., the now-defunct production company. Andrew Cochran, the creator of Theodore Tugboat, had told his son bedtime stories about the boats in the big harbour and how they interacted with everyone. This later became the basis for the TV series. Theodore became so popular, the company constructed a life-size model of him for marketing and promoting water safety. The boat is unusual, as it is a full-size replica of a scale model. The original model which was used to film the series and inspired Theodore Too can be seen at Halifax's Maritime Museum of the Atlantic. Theodore Too was built at Snyder's Shipyard in Dayspring, Nova Scotia and launched on April 19, 2000. After sea trials out of Lunenburg, the vessel made its first port call to Halifax on May 6, 2000.  The ocean-going boat made a 50-city tour down the eastern seaboard to Tampa Bay and back again through the Great Lakes to Chicago. Theodore Too became the Ambassador of the U.S. National Safe Boating Council and mascot to the U.S. Coast Guard, participating in several tall ship events. For most of its time touring the eastern seaboard and Great Lakes, Theodore Too had a full-time three-person crew, headed by  Captain Bill Stewart, a 25-year veteran tugboat captain, who also had an additional nine years as a 44-foot motor lifeboat coxswain in the Canadian Coast Guard. After Cochran Entertainment went out of business, the boat was purchased by a Halifax tour boat company, Murphys on the Water. The vessel provided tours of Halifax Harbour in the summer, operating from the Cable Wharf in downtown Halifax.

On July 16, 2020, Ambassatours announced plans to sell Theodore Too.

Theodore Too was sold to Blair McKeil of McKeil Marine in Burlington. The tug is now expected to collaborate with Swim Drink Fish, a water education and conservation advocacy group, and will promote sustainability and preservation of the Great Lakes. After 21 years, the tug departed the waters off of the Halifax Harbour in early June en route to his new home at the Hamilton Harbour.  On July 18, 2021, the tug arrived in Hamilton.

Specifications

The boat was designed by Fred Allen and naval architect Marius Lengkeek of Lengkeek Vessel Engineering, and was built by Snyder's Shipyard in Dayspring, Nova Scotia, on the Lahave River, not far from Bridgewater, Nova Scotia.

The hull and wheelhouse are made entirely of wood, with a fibreglass hat and smokestack. It has a 'face' on the wheelhouse, with large realistic hydraulic eyes which are no longer operational. The boat displays a number of prop details such as winches and towing bitts inspired from real tugs but operates as a tour boat, not a real tug boat.

See also
Theodore Tugboat – The TV series

References

External links

Red Cross joins forces with Theodore Tugboat to promote water safety

Ships built in Nova Scotia
2000 ships
Tourist attractions in Halifax County, Nova Scotia
Replica ships